Frederick A. Robinson was an American football coach.  He was the head football coach at Western University of Pennsylvania—now known as the  University of Pittsburgh–from 1898 to 1899 seasons, compiling a record of 8–3–2.

Head coaching record

References

Year of birth missing
Year of death missing
Pittsburgh Panthers football coaches